Boykov (masculine) or Boykova (feminine) is a Russian and Bulgarian surname. Notable people with the surname include:

Nikolay Boykov (born 1968), Bulgarian writer
Vladimir Boykov (born 1976), Russian footballer

Russian-language surnames